Agdistis meridionalis, the sea-side plume, is a moth of the family Pterophoridae, first described by the German entomologist Philipp Christoph Zeller in 1847. It is found in Europe.

Description
The wingspan is 22–25 mm. Adults are on wing from July to October, in two generations. The preferred habitats are grassy coastal slopes, cliffs and undercliffs where they can be found resting by day, with the rolled wings pointing forward and upwards.

The larvae feed on the leaves of rock sea-lavender (Limonium binervosum).

Distribution
Agdistis meridionalis is found in Europe mostly in countries bordering the Mediterranean.

References

External links
 Plant Parasites of Europe

Agdistinae
Moths described in 1847
Moths of Europe
Taxa named by Philipp Christoph Zeller